Mazhya Navryachi Bayko (IAST:Māzhyā Navaryācī Bāyakō)  was an Indian television serial airing on Zee Marathi and also digitally available on ZEE5. The show premiered on 22 August 2016 and produced by Tejendra Neswankar under the banner of Trrump Carrd production. The show stars Anita Date-Kelkar, Abhijeet Khandkekar, Rasika Sunil, Adwait Dadarkar and Ruchira Jadhav in lead roles.

The show is one of the top rated Marathi TV show from its inception and also Zee Marathi's sixth longest running Marathi soap opera. The show received highest ratings of 8.8 TVR.

Summary 
It is a story of Gurunath and Radhika. They came to Mumbai from Nagpur. Radhika has a strong perception that her husband will not cheat her, so revelation comes as shock to her. Gurunath had an affair with Shanaya. Anand and Saumitra are friends of Gurunath and Radhika, but they support Radhika.

Plot 
The show started from Radhika. She make tiffin for her husband Gurunath and son Atharva. She make Popat Pohe for Gurunath, but he didn't like it. While secretly talking to Shanaya, Gurunath gets petrified on suddenly seeing Radhika on his room. Gurunath informs Radhika that he is going out on an official Delhi tour, but goes to Shanaya's house instead. Gurunath's senior Panvalkar Sir calls Radhika and invites her for the annual party organised by their office. Gurunath takes Shanaya out on lunch and later for Shopping. Shanaya tells Gurunath that she doesn't want him to take Radhika to the party. Later in the evening, Gurunath calls Radhika and informs her that he will return home in the morning. Shanaya expresses her disappointment over Gurunath.

Radhika gets excited for the party. Gurunath tells Radhika that he doesn't want her to attend the party. Radhika disheartened by Gurunath's words. Radhika decides to attend the party despite Gurunath's forbidding her. Later at the hotel, Gurunath gets disgraceful to see Radhika at the party. Shanaya gets annoyed by Radhika's presence at that party and leaves the function. Gurunath gets promoted to the post of senior manager. Radhika invites Gurunath's boss to their house for dinner. Gurunath gets humiliated by Shanaya. While returning home, Radhika praises Gurunath for his hardwork.

After few days, Subodh Gupte calls Radhika's friend Revati Abhyankar to inform her that he saw Shanaya along with Radhika and Gurunath. Gurunath looks for an opportunity to talk to Shanaya. Radhika tells Shanaya to stop calling Gurunath as Garry. When Radhika knows that Gurunath has affair with Shanaya, then Gurunath advises Radhika to leave his house. Radhika tells Gurunath that she wishes to stay with him for rest of her life. She requests him to not throw her away from his house. Gurunath refuses to listen to Radhika's plea. He further clears it to Radhika that he will continue to meet Shanaya.

6 months later
Radhika and Gurunath's childhood friend Saumitra comes from United States. Radhika working hard with the help of Saumitra. She wants to punish Gurunath and go ahead of him.

She makes Masale and open her own company Radhika Masale and becomes owner of 300 crore rupees. Shanaya and Gurunath dress up and plan to put their best food forward to impress their new boss. Later, Gurunath's mother is displeased after finding out that Radhika is going to be Gurunath's new boss. Radhika arrives with her team and receives a grand welcome. Shanaya and Gurunath make their way through the crowd and they get shocked to see her. They're left in disbelief when Radhika reveals that she is their new boss. Unable to handle Radhika's success, a drunken Gurunath arrives in her society and starts throwing tantrums. He then accuses her of trying to seek revenge on her. However, after getting an earful from Radhika, an infuriated Gurunath threatens to teach her lesson. After that, Radhika falls in love with her friends Saumitra.

One year later
She married with Saumitra. However Gurunath, who attends the wedding in the guise of a band player, feels sad. Saumitra and Radhika promise to be with each other for lifetime and perform the rest of the rituals. After that, Saumitra's family warmly welcomes Maya. Gurunath and Shanaya's friend KD (Abhijeet Guru) gets worried as Shanaya and Sulakshana, Shanaya's mother, comes to stay at his house. Maya shares her views about Radhika with Saumitra. Gurunath gives an earful to Shanaya and Sulakshana, when they ask for Ranjan Mehta's money. Radhika allocates the work to everyone in the office. Later to impress Maya, Gurunath demonstrates a sale strategy before her.

After Gurunath deceives Shanaya, she goes to the Radhika's side. She helps Radhika in all those matters. Everyone is busy preparing for Shanaya's wedding. Gurunath thinks that Shanaya wants to marry with him and is all set to marry her. Radhika and Saumitra have made a plan to break Maya and Gurunath's relationship. Shanaya is to get married with her friend Kunal Kulkarni, but they have lied to everyone that she's to get married with Shreyas. On the other hand, Shanaya traps Gurunath in her plan and tells him that she wants to marry him. Gurunath is all set to marry her However, Saumitra informs Maya about Gurunath's intention and asks her to attend Shanaya's wedding. Radhika finally tells Gurunath that Shanaya's real groom is Kunal.

After few days, Jenny gets kidnapped by Gotyasheth, a local liquor seller Radhika decides to shut the local liquor stores. The inspector refuses to write up a complaint when Maya and Shreyas go to police station. Radhika informs the women about voting for the ban of alcohol. When Radhika realises that Gotya Sheth's hand is behind this. Gotya Sheth comes to meet Radhika dressed as Kamlakar. Everyone feels anxious as he kidnaps Jenny. Seeing the gift sent by Gotya Sheth, Saumitra suggests Radhika to leave the village. Gotya Sheth questions Santosh on how did Radhika finish the order. Everyone cooks for Jenny as she wishes to have Punjabi food. Gurunath continues to request Gotya Sheth to get his wife back for him. After that, Gotya Sheth tells Gurunath that he is going to kill Radhika's loved ones. Later, he makes a phone call and asks the person on the other side to arrange for a bulldozer and a marriage hall. Radhika receives threat from someone. Radhika finds the letter threatening to demolish the warehouse just when Seema Tai is home.

Saumitra and Maya realise it could be Gotya Sheth’s plan and take precautionary measures to save Radhika. Radhika meets with Gotya Sheth. Radhika gets shocked on seeing that the man who is breaking the warehouse down is Gurunath. Anand tells Saumitra and Maya that Radhika has learnt about Gurunath. Gurunath reveals to Radhika that he is not mentally deranged and threatens to kill Saumitra if she doesn't become his. After that, Gotya Sheth calls Radhika and says he is coming to meet her. Maya comes up with a plan to get him in a fix. She puts up cameras in the room and tells everyone her plan, including Saumitra. Gotya Sheth comes to meet Radhika at the bungalow where there are cameras according to Maya’s plan. Gurunath requests Sarita as he wishes to meet Atharva. The threats given by Gotya Sheth get recorded on the hidden cameras and Shreyas sends the video to Saumitra. Later, Radhika slaps Gotya Sheth hearing his vile comments. Gotya Sheth sees the video on his phone and falls to Radhika’s feet and apologises. The police officers arrest Gotya Sheth and his men. Saumitra is elated to see Shanaya arrive. Radhika, Shanaya and Maya join forces to teach Gurunath a lesson. Saumitra talks to Radhika about the opportunity asked by Gurunath. Radhika tells Saumitra the importance of him being in Atharva's life. The series end with a award ceremony, the women in Radhika's life sings praises for her. Meanwhile, Maya and Shanaya expose Gurunath's lies with the help of his other girlfriends. Later, everyone ousts Gurunath.

Cast

Main
 Anita Date-Kelkar as Radhika Gurunath Subhedar / Radhika Saumitra Banhatti (Radha); Gurunath's first wife, Saumitra's first wife, Atharva's mother (2016-2021)
 Abhijeet Khandkekar as Gurunath Vasant Subhedar (Garry / Guru); Radhika's first husband, Shanaya's first husband, Maya's boyfriend, Atharva's biological father (2016-2021)
 Rasika Sunil as Shanaya Sabnis / Shanaya Kunal Kulkarni (Baccha); Gurunath's second wife, Kunal's current wife (2016-August 2018 / July–December 2020 / March 2021)
 Isha Keskar replacing Rasika as Shanaya Sabnis (September 2018-March 2020)
 Adwait Dadarkar as Saumitra Yashwant Banhatti (Sammy / Bokya); Radhika's husband, Gurunath, Anand and Maya's friend, Atharva's adoptive father (2018-2021)
 Ruchira Jadhav as Maya; Gurunath's girlfriend, Saumitra's friend (2020-2021)

Recurring
 Bharati Patil as Sarita Vasant Subhedar; Gurunath's mother, Radhika's first mother-in-law (2016-2021)
 Devendra Dodke as Vasant Subhedar; Gurunath's father, Radhika's first father-in-law (2016-2021)
 Kishori Ambiye as Sulakshana Sabnis; Shanaya's mother (2018-2021)
 Aryan Devgiri as Atharva Gurunath Subhedar; Radhika and Gurunath's biological son, Saumitra's adoptive son (2016-2021)
 Vandana Pandit-Sheth as Vasundhara Yashwant Banhatti; Saumitra's mother, Radhika's second mother-in-law (2019-2020) 
 Gautam Jogalekar as Yashwant Banhatti; Saumitra's father, Radhika's second father-in-law (2019-2021)
 Arun Nalawade as Ramchandra Damle (Nana) (2016-2020)
 Suhita Thatte as Bharati Ramchandra Damle (Nani) (2016-2021)
 Shweta Mehendale as Revati Mandar Abhyankar / Revati Subodh Gupte; Radhika's friend, Subodh's wife (2016-2020)
 Yash Pradhan as Subodh Gupte (2016-2019)
 Sharmila Shinde as Jenny Anand Shah (2016-2021)
 Mihir Rajda as Anand Shah (2016-2021)
 Abhijeet Guru as KD (2016-2021)
 Sachin Deshpande as Shreyas Madhukar Kulkarni (2016-2021)
 Jayant Ghate as Panvalkar Sir (2016-2021)
 Shriram Pendse as Mahajani Uncle (2016-2020)
 Kanchan Gupte as Mahajani Aunt (2016-2021)
 Pravin Dalimbkar as Raghu (2016-2021)
 Shambhavi Karambalekar as Neha Mandar Abhyankar (2016-2019)
 Vidyadhar Paranjape as Mahadik Sir (2016-2019)
 Pratima Kulkarni as Sathe Madam (2016-2021)
 Aditi Dravid as Isha; Shanaya's friend (2016-2018)
 Kiran Mane as Shirish; Radhika's brother, Chitra's husband (2016-2019)
 Chitra Khare as Shirish's wife (2016-2019)
 Vipul Salunkhe as Pankaj Ramchandra Damle (2016-2019)
 Prajakta Datar-Ganpule as Samidha Pankaj Damle (2016-2019)
 Priya Nanaware as Bhakti; Atharva's teacher, Shanaya's roommate (2016-2019)
 Suyog Gorhe as Kunal Kulkarni; Shanaya's husband (2016-2020)
 Rohini Ninawe as KD's Aunt (2016-2018)
 Vijay Veer as Society watchman (2016-2019)
 Swati Bowalekar as Bakula (2016-2021)
 Amruta Malwadkar as Inspector Pradnya; Bakula's daughter (2016-2018)
 Deepak Joshi as Mr. Kadam (2016-2021)
 Nishant Pathare as Office worker (2018-2020)
 Siddhi Ture as Office worker (2018-2020)
 Shruti as RJ Shruti (2020-2021)

Guest appearances
 Milind Shinde as Gotya Sheth (2021)
 Aniket Kelkar as Mandar Abhyankar (2017)
 Vinamra Babhal as Waiter (2017)
 Sachin Shirke as Marriage Hall Manager (2020)
 Sagar Sakpal as Advertise Director (2020)
 Pooja Kale as Shruti's assistant (2020)
 Vikas Patil as Saiprasad Mahajani (2020)
 Komal Dhande as Urmila (2019)
 Kishor Chaughule as Popatrao (2019)
 Vishwanath Kulkarni as Omkar Pradhan (2019)
 Meera Jagannath as Sanjana (2018)
 Madhavi Nimkar as Devika (2017)

Cameo appearance
 Mohan Joshi (2018)
 Shruti Marathe (2021)

Production

Casting
Anita Date-Kelkar was selected to play Radhika Subhedar, Abhijeet Khandkekar was selected to play Gurunath Subhedar and Rasika Sunil was selected to play Shanaya Sabnis. In April 2018, Adwait Dadarkar entered the show as second male lead Saumitra Banhatti. In September 2018, Rasika Sunil quit the show for her Directorate education. After her exit, Isha Keskar was selected to replace Shanaya. In July 2020, Isha Keskar exits from the show and Rasika Sunil re-entered the show as Shanaya. After that in January 2021, Rasika Sunil again exits from the show to look for her new opportunities and her character was shown as she married with Kunal and settle down in America. Ruchira Jadhav entered the show as Maya in January 2020.

Filming 

Based on the backdrop of City, the series mainly filmed on the sets which is created on Thane. They mainly filmed in Upvan Lake, area of Gadkari Rangaytan. The series has set in a residential complex in Thane, but recently the team decided to shift it to a resort near Igatpuri in Nashik due to COVID-19 pandemic, but after Diwali, they again shifted to their original location set in Thane.

Airing history
It was aired from 22 August 2016 on Zee Marathi replacing Pasant Aahe Mulgi.

Reception
The show completed 4 years with more than 1350 episodes. The show generally had highest TRP in Marathi genre. The show received highest TV Ratings of 8.2 & 8.3 (January), 8.5 (October), 8.7 (April) and 8.8 (August) in the year 2018. The show always gained position in Top 5 Marathi TV shows from its beginning up to September 2020.

Ratings

Cancellation
Due to falling ratings of serial from October 2020, makers revamped the story but it didn't work. Therefore, channel decide to shift show to non-prime timeslot of 6:30 pm but the TRP of the show continued to drop and the show lost position in top 10 ranking, leading to the channel and makers pulling of the show. The show went off air on 7 March 2021 with its finale after 4.5 years.

Special episode

1 hour
 25 September 2016
 25 December 2016
 15 April 2018
 2 September 2018
 6 January 2019
 19 May 2019
 15 December 2019
 1 November 2020
 13 December 2020
 7 February 2021

2 hours
 29 July 2018 (Radha-Guru's Divorce)
 7 March 2021 (Last Episode)

Adaptations

Awards

References

External links
  
 Mazhya Navryachi Bayko at ZEE5

Marathi-language television shows
Zee Marathi original programming
2016 Indian television series debuts
2021 Indian television series endings